= Iaan Exodium =

Iaan Exordium

General information
- Status: Completed
- Type: Residential
- Architectural style: High-rise
- Location: Ulsan, South Korea
- Completed: 2010

Height
- Roof: 201 m (659 ft)

Technical details
- Floor count: 54

Website
- Official Website

Iaan Exordium, also known as Iaan Taewha River Exordium, consists of two twin 54-floors, 201 m (659 ft) residential skyscrapers currently topped-out in Ulsan, South Korea and finishing construction in 2010. They have become the two tallest buildings in South Korea's seventh largest metropolis, Ulsan, becoming the city's new landmark icon.
